The Areni-1 cave complex is a multicomponent site, and late Chalcolithic/Early Bronze Age ritual site and settlement, located near the Areni village in southern Armenia along the Arpa River.

Findings 
In 2008, Armenian PhD student and archeologist Diana Zardaryan of the country’s Institute of Archaeology discovered the earliest known shoe at the site. In January 2011, the earliest known winery in the world was uncovered in the cave. Later, in 2011, the discovery of a straw skirt dating to 3,900 years BCE was reported. In 2009, the oldest humanoid brain was discovered in the cave. Recent archaeological investigations demonstrate that

Genetics 
Three individuals who lived in the Chalcolithic era (c. 5700–6250 years BP), found in the Areni-1 ("Bird's Eye") cave were identified as belonging to haplogroup L1a. One individual's genome indicated that he had red hair and blue eyes.

Gallery

See also
 Areni-1 shoe
 Areni-1 winery

Notes

Archaeological sites in Armenia
Geography of Vayots Dzor Province
Caves of Armenia
Areni
Kura-Araxes culture
Populated places established in the 5th millennium BC